Sulfur-reducing bacteria are microorganisms able to reduce elemental sulfur (S0) to hydrogen sulfide (H2S). These microbes use inorganic sulfur compounds as electron acceptors to sustain several activities such as respiration, conserving energy and growth, in absence of oxygen. The final product or these processes, sulfide, has a considerable influence on the chemistry of the environment and, in addition, is used as electron donor for a large variety of microbial metabolisms. Several types of bacteria and many non-methanogenic archaea can reduce sulfur. The first pure cultured species of sulfur-reducing bacteria, Desulfuromonas acetoxidans, was discovered in 1976 and described by Pfennig Norbert and Biebel Hanno as an anaerobic sulfur-reducing and acetate-oxidizing bacterium, not able to reduce sulfate. Only few taxa are true sulfur-reducing bacteria, using sulfur reduction as the only or main catabolic reaction. Normally, they couple this reaction with the oxidation of acetate, succinate or other organic compounds. In general, sulfate-reducing bacteria are able to use both sulfate and elemental sulfur as electron acceptors. Thanks to its abundancy and thermodynamic stability, sulfate is the most studied electron acceptor for anaerobic respiration that involves sulfur compounds. Elemental sulfur, however, is very abundant and important, especially in deep-sea hydrothermal vents, hot springs and other extreme environments, making its isolation more difficult. Some bacteriasuch as Proteus, Campylobacter, Pseudomonas and Salmonellahave the ability to reduce sulfur, but can also use oxygen and other terminal electron acceptors.

Taxonomy 
Sulfur reducers are known to cover about 74 genera within the Bacteria domain. Several types of sulfur-reducing bacteria have been discovered in different habitats like deep and shallow sea hydrothermal vents, freshwater, volcanic acidic hot springs and others. Many sulfur reducers belong to the phylum Thermodesulfobacteriota (Desulfuromonas, Pelobacter, Desulfurella, Geobacter), the class Gammaproteobacteria, and the phylum Campylobacterota according to GTDB classification. Other phyla that present sulfur-reducing bacteria are: Bacillota (Desulfitobacterium, Ammonifex, and Carboxydothermus), Aquificota (Desulfurobacterium and Aquifex), Synergistota (Dethiosulfovibrio), Deferribacterota (Geovibrio), Thermodesulfobacteriota, Spirochaetota, and Chrysiogenota.

Metabolism 
Sulfur reduction metabolism is an ancient process, found in the deep branches of the phylogenetic tree. Sulfur reduction uses elemental sulfur (S0) and generates hydrogen sulfide (H2S) as the main end product. This metabolism is largely present in extreme environments where, especially in recent years, many microorganisms have been isolated, bringing new and important data on the subject.

Many sulfur-reducing bacteria are able to produce ATP through lithotrophic sulfur respiration, using zero-valence sulfur as electron acceptor, for instance the genera Wolinella, Ammonifex, Desulfuromonas and Desulfurobacterium. On the other side, there are obligate fermenters able to reduce elemental sulfur, for example Thermotoga, Thermosipho and Fervidobacterium. Among these fermenters there are species, such as Thermotoga maritina, that are not dependent on sulfur reduction, and utilize it as a supplementary electron sink. Some researches propose the hypothesis that polysulfide could be an intermediate of sulfur respiration, due to the conversion of elemental sulfur into polysulfide that occurs in sulfide solutions, performing this reaction:

Pseudomonadota 
The Pseudomonadota  are a  major phylum of gram-negative bacteria. There is a wide range of metabolisms. Most members are facultative or obligately anaerobic, chemoautotrophs and heterotrophics. Many are able to move using flagella, others are nonmotile. They are currently divided into several classes, referred to by Greek letters, based on rRNA sequences: Alphaproteobacteria, Betaproteobacteria, Gammaproteobacteria, Zetaproteobacteria, etc.

Class Gammaproteobacteria 
The Gammaproteobacteria class include several medically, ecologically and scientifically important groups of bacteria. They are major organisms in diverse marine ecosystems and even extreme environments. This class contains a huge variety of taxonomic and metabolic diversity, including aerobic and anaerobic species, chemolitoauthotrophic, chemoorganotrophic and phototrophic species and also free living, biofilms formers, commensal and symbionts.

Acidithiobacillus spp. 
Acidithiobacillus are chemolithoautrophics, Gram-negative road-shaped bacteria, using energy from the oxidation of iron and sulfur containing minerals for growth. They are able to live at extremely low pH (pH 1–2) and fixes both carbon and nitrogen from the atmosphere. It solubilizes copper and other metals from rocks and plays an important role in nutrient and metal biogeochemical cycling in acid environments. Acidithiobacillus ferrooxidans is abundant in natural environments associated with pyritic ore bodies, coal deposits, and their acidified drainages. It obtain energy by the oxidation of reduced sulfur compounds and it can also reduce ferric ion and elemental sulfur, thus promoting the recycling of iron and sulfur compounds under anaerobic conditions. It can also fix  and nitrogen and be a primary producer of carbon and nitrogen in acidic environments.

Shewanella spp. 
Shewanella are Gram-negative, motile bacilli. The first description of the species was provided in 1931, Shewanella putrefaciens, a non-fermentative bacilli with a single polar flagellum which grow well on conventional solid media. This species is pathogenic for humans, even if infections are rare and reported especially in the geographic area characterized by warm climates.

Pseudomonas spp. 
Pseudomonas are Gram-negative chemoorganotrophic Gammaproteobacteria, straight or slightly curved rod-shaped. They are able to move thanks to one or several polar flagella; rarely nonmotile. Aerobic, having a strictly respiratory type of metabolism with oxygen as the terminal electron acceptor; in some cases, allowing growth anaerobically, nitrate can be used as an alternate electron acceptor. Almost all the species fail to grow under acid conditions (pH 4.5 or lower). Pseudomonas are widely distributed in nature. Some species are pathogenic for humans, animals, or plants. Type species: Pseudomonas mendocina.

Phylum Thermodesulfobacteriota 
The Thermodesulfobacteriota phylum comprises several morphologically different bacterial groups, Gram-negative, non-sporeforming that exhibit either anaerobic or aerobic growth. They are ubiquitous in marine sediments and contains most of the known sulfur reducing bacteria (e.g. Desulfuromonas spp.). The aerobic representatives are able to digest other bacteria and several of these members are important constituents of the microflora in soil and waters.

Desulfuromusa spp. 
They are gram negative and complete oxidizer bacteria; their cells are motile and slightly curved or rod shaped. Three sulfur reducing species are known, Desulfromusa kysingii, Desulfuromusa bakii and Desulfuromusa succinoxidans.

Desulfurella spp. 
Desulfurella are short rod-shaped, gram-negative cells, motile thanks to a single polar flagellum or nonmotile, non-sporeforming. Obligately anaerobic, moderate thermophilic, they generally occur in warm sediments and in thermally heated cyanobacterial or bacterial communities that are rich in organic compounds and elemental sulfur. Type species: Desulfurella acetivorans.

Hippea spp. 
Hippea species are moderate thermophiles neutrophiles to moderate acidophiles, obligate anaerobes sulfur-reducing bacteria with gram-negative rod-shaped cells. They are able to grow lithotrophically with hydrogen and sulfur, and oxidize completely volatile fatty acids, fatty acids and alcohols. They inhabit submarine hot vents. The type species is Hippea maritima.

Desulfuromonas spp. 
Desulfuromonas species are gram-negative, mesophilic, obligately anaerobic and complete oxidizers  sulfur-reducing bacteria. They are able to grow on acetate as sole organic substrate and reduce elemental sulfur or polysulfide to sulfide. Currently known species of the genus Desulfuromonas are Desulfuromonas acetoxidans, Desulfuromonas acetexigens, the marine organism Desulfuromonas palmitates and Desulfuromonas thiophila.
 Desulfiromonas thiophila is an obligate anaerobic bacteria, that uses sulfur as only electron acceptor. Multiplies by binary fission and cells are motile thanks to polar flagella. They live in anoxic mud of freshwater sulfur springs, at a temperature from 26 to 30 °C and pH 6.9 to 7.9.

Geobacter spp. 
Geobacter species have a respiratory metabolism with Fe(III) serving as the common terminal electron acceptor in all species.
 Geobacter sulfurreducens was isolated from a drainage ditch in Norman, Okla. It is rod-shaped, gram-negative, non-motile and non-spore forming. The optimum temperature range is 30 to 35°. About the metabolism, is strict anaerobic chemoorganotroph which oxidizes acetate with Fe(III), S, Co(III), fumarate, or malate as the electron acceptor. Hydrogen is also used as an electron donor for Fe(III) reduction, whereas other carboxylic acids, sugars, alcohols, amino acids, yeast extract, phenol, and benzoate are not. C-type cytochromes was found in cells.

Pelobacter spp. 
Pelobacter is unique group of fermentative microorganisms belonging to the phylum Thermodesulfobacteriota. They consume fermentatively alcohols such as 2,3-butanediol, acetoin and ethanol, but not sugars, with acetate plus ethanol and/or hydrogen as the end products.
 Paleobacter carbinolcus, isolated from anoxic mud, it belongs to the family Desulfuromonadaceae. This bacterial species grow by fermentation,  syntrophic hydrogen/formate transfer, or electron transfer to sulfur from short-chain alcohols, hydrogen or formate but they don't oxidize acetate. There aren't no recent informations about sugar fermentation or autotrophic growth. The sequencing analysis of genome demonstrated the expression of c-type cytochromes and the utilization of Fe (III) as a terminal acceptor with the indirect reduction of elemental sulfur that acts as a shuttle for electron transfer to Fe (III). Recent study thought that this electron transfer involves two periplasmic thioredoxins (Pcar_0426, Pcar_0427), an outer membrane protein (Pcar_0428), and a cytoplasmic oxidoreductase (Pcar_0429) encoded by the most highly upregulated genes.

Thermodesulfobacteriota 
Thermodesulfobacteriota are Gram- negative, rod-shaped cells, occur singly, in pairs, or in chains in young cultures. Do not form spores. Usually nonmotile, but motility might be observed in some species. Thermophilic, strictly anaerobic, chemoheterotrophs.

Phylum Campylobacterota 
The phylum Campylobacterota presents many sulfur-oxidizing known species, that have been recently recognized as able to reduce elemental sulfur, in some cases also preferring this pathway, coupled with hydrogen oxidation. Here's a list of the species able to reduce elemental sulfur. The mechanism used to reduce sulfur is still unclear for some of these species.

Wolinella 
Wolinella is a sulfur reducing genus of bacteria and incomplete oxidizer that cannot use acetate as an electron donor. Publicly know is one species, Wolinella succinogenens.
 Wolinella succinogenens is a well known non-vent sulfur-reducing bacteria, found in cattle rumen, that utilizes a [Ni-fe] hydrogenase to oxidize hydrogen and a single periplasmatic polysulfide reductase (PsrABC) bounded to the inner membrane to reduce elemental sulfur.

Sulfurospirillum 
Sulfurospirillum species are sulfur reducing bacteria and incomplete oxidizer that use either  or formate as electron donor but not acetate.

Sulfurovum 
 Sulfurovum sp. NCB37-1 has been given the hypothesis in which a polysulfide reductase (PsrABC) is involved in its sulfur reduction.

Sulfurimonas 
Sulfurimonas species were previously considered as chemolithoautotrophic sulfur-oxidizing bacteria (SOB), and there were only genetic evidences supporting a possible sulfur-reducing metabolism, but now it has been proved that sulfur reduction occurs in this genus. The mechanism and the enzymes involved in this process have also been deduced, using Sulfurimonas sp. NW10 as a representative. In particular the presence of both a cytoplasmic and a periplasmic polysulfide reductases has been detected, in order to reduce cyclooctasulfur, which is the most common form of elemental sulfur in vent environments.
 Sulfurimonas sp. NW10 shows an over-expression of the gene clusters ( and ) coding for the two reductases while reducing sulfur. These clusters were also found in other Sulfurimonas species isolated from hydrothermal vents, meaning that sulfur reduction is common in Sulfurimonas spp.

Further genetic analysis revealed that the polysulfide reductases from Sulfurimonas sp.NW10 share less than 40% sequence similarity with the one from W.succinogenes. This means that through time there has been a significant genetic differentiation between the two bacteria, most likely due to their different environments. Furthermore, the cytoplasmic sulfur-reduction performed by Sulfurimonas sp. NW10 is nowadays considered unique, being the only example among all the mesophilic sulfur-reducing bacteria. Before this discover, only two hyperthermophilic bacteria were known to be able to do cytoplasmic sulfur-reduction, Aquifex aeolicus and Thermovibrio ammonificans.

Nautilia 
Nautilia species are anaerobic, neutrophile, thermophilic sulfur-reducing bacteria, first discovered and isolated from a polychaete worm inhabiting deep sea hydrothermal vents, Alvinella pompejana. They are very short, gram-negative, motile and rod-shaped cells with a single polar flagellum. Utilize sugars, peptides, organic acids or alcohols is not required both in the absence and presence of sulfur. They rarely use sulfite and colloidal sulfur as electron acceptors. Sulfate, thiosulfate, nitrate, fumarate and ferric iron are not used. Four species have been found: Nautilia lithotrophica, Nautilia profundicola, Nautilia nitratireducens and Nautilia abyssi. The type species is Nautilia lithotrophica.
 Nautilia abyssi is gram-negative sulfur reducing bacteria, that lives in anaerobic conditions at great depths (like hydrothermal vent). Grow range is from 33° to 65 °C and pH optimum is 6.0-6.5. Cells have single polar flagellum used for motion similar to other species of genus.

Caminibacter 
 Caminibacter mediatlanticus was first isolated from a deep-sea hydrothermal vent on the Middle Atlantic Ridge. It is a thermophilic chemolithoautotroph, -oxidizing marine bacteria, that uses nitrate or elemental sulfur as electron acceptors, producing ammonia or hydrogen sulfide and it cannot use oxygen, thiosulfate, sulfite, selenate and arsenate. Its growth optimum is at 55 °C, and it seems to be inhibited by acetate, formate, lactate and peptone.

Aquificota 
Aquificota phylum comprises rod-shaped, motile cells. Includes chemoorganotrophs and some of them are able to reduce elemental sulfur. Growth has been observed between pH 6.0 and 8.0.

Aquifex 
Aquifex are rod-shaped, Gram-negative, nonsporulating cells with rounded ends. Wedge-shaped refractile areas in the cells are formed during growth. Type species: Aquifex pyrophilus.

Desulfurobacterium 
Desulfurobacterium are rod-shaped, Gram-negative cells. Type species: Desulfurobacterium thermolithotrophum.

Thermovibrio ammonificans 
Thermovibrio ammonificans is a gram-negative sulfur reducing bacteria, found in deep sea hydrothermal vent chimney. Thiosulfate, sulfite and oxygen are not used as electron acceptors. Cells are short rods shape and motile thanks to polar flagellation. Their growth range temperature is from 60 °C to 80 °C and pH 5–7.

Thermosulfidibacter spp. 
Thermosulfidibacter are gram-negative, anaerobic, thermophilic and neutrophilic bacteria. Strictly chemolithoautotrophic. The type species is Thermosulfidibacter takaii.

 Thermosulfidibacter takaii a re motile rods with a polar flagellum. Strictly anaerobic. Growth occurs at 55–78 °C (optimum, 70 °C), pH 5.0–7.5 (optimum, pH 5.5–6.0). They are sulfur-reducers.

Bacillota 
Bacillota are mostly Gram-positive bacteria with some Gram-negative exceptions.

Ammonifex 
These bacteria are Gram-negative, extremely thermophilic, strictly anaerobic, faculatative chemolithoautotrophic. Type species: Ammonifex degensii.

Carboxydothermus 

 Carboxydothermus pertinax differs from other members of his genus by its ability to grow chemolithoautotrophically with reduction of elemental sulfur or thiosulfate coupled to CO oxidation. The other electron acceptor is ferric citrate, amorphous iron (III) oxide, 9,10-anthraquinone 2,6-disulfonate. Cells are rod-shaped with peritrichous flagella and grow at 65 °C temperature.

Chrysiogenota 
Chrysiogenota are Gram-negative bacteria, motile thanks to a single polar flagellum, curved, rod-shaped cells. They are mesophilic, exhibiting anaerobic respiration in which arsenate serves as the electron acceptor. Strictly anaerobic, these bacteria are grown at 25-30 °C.

Desulfurispirillum spp. 
Desulfurispirillum species are gram-negative, motile spirilla, obligately anaerobic with respiratory metabolism. Use elemental sulfur and nitrate as electron acceptors, and short-chain fatty acids and hydrogen as electron donors. Alkaliphilic and slightly halophilic.

 Desulfurispirillum alkaliphilum is obligate anaerobic and heterotrophic bacteria, motile by single bipolar flagella. It uses elemental sulfur, polysulfide, nitrate and fumarate as electron acceptors. The final products are sulfide and ammonium. Utilizes short-chain fatty acids and H2 as electron donor and carbon as source. It is moderate alkaliphilic with a pH range for growth between 8.0 and 10.2 and an optimum at pH 9.0 and slightly halophilic with a salt range from 0.1 to 2.5 M Na+. Mesophilic with a maximum temperature for growth at 45 and an optimum at 35 °C.

Spirochaetota 
Spirochaetes are free-living, gram-negative, helical-shaped and motile bacteria, often protist or animal-associated. They are obligate and facultative anaerobes. Among this phylum, two species are recognized as sulfur-reducing bacteria, Spirochaeta perfilievii and Spirochaeta smaragdinae.

 Spirochaeta perfilievii are gram-negative, helical bacteria. Their size range varies from 10 to 200 μm. The shortest cells are those grown in extremely anaerobic environments. They are mesophilic with a temperature range 4–32 °C (optimum at 28–30 °C). Grows at pH 6.5–8.5 (optimum pH 7.0–7.5). Obligate, moderate halophile. Under anaerobic conditions, sulfur and thiosulfate are reduced to sulfide.
 Spirochaeta smaragdinae are gram-negative, chemoorganotrophic, obligately anaerobic and halophilic bacteria. They are able to reduce sulfur to sulfide. Their temperature range is from 20 to 40 °C (optimum 37 °C), their pH range varies from 5.5 to 8.0 (optimum 7.0).

Synergistota

Dethiosulfovibrio spp. 
Dethiosulfovibrio are a gram negative sulfur reducing bacteria that was isolated from "Thiodendron", bacterial sulfur mats obtained from different saline environments. Cells are curved or fibroid-like rods and motile thanks to flagella located on the concave side of the cells.
The temperature range is from 15° to 40 °C and at pH values between 5±5 and 8±0. About their metabolism, they ferments proteins, peptides, some organic acids and amino acids like serine, histidine, lysine, arginine, cysteine and threonine. Only in the presence of sulfur or thiosulfate can use alanine, glutamate, isoleucine, leucine and valine, moreover the presence of sulfur or thiosulfate increases the cell yield and the growth rate. They are obligately anaerobic and slightly halophilic. In the presence of fermentable substrates they are able to reduce elemental sulfur and thiosulfate but not sulfate or sulfite to sulfide. Unable to utilize carbohydrates, alcohols and some organic acids like acetate or succinate. Four species were found, Dethiosulfovibrio russensis, Dethiosulfovibrio marinus, Dethiosulfovibrio peptidovorans and Dethiosulfovibrio acidaminovorans

Thermanaerovibrio spp. 
Thermophilic and neutrophilic Gram-negative bacteria. Motile thanks to lateral flagella, located on the concave side of the cell. Non-spore-forming. Multiplication occurs by binary fission. Inhabits the granular methanogenic sludge and neutral hot springs. The type species is Thermanaerovibrio acidaminovorans 
 Thermanaerovibrio velox is gram-negative bacteria that was isolated from a thermophilic cyanobacterial mat from caldera Uzon, Kamchatka, Russia. The reproduction occurs by binary-fission and they do not form spore. Growth temperature goes from 45° to 70°, and pH range from 4 to 8.

Thermotogota 
Thermotoga spp. are gram-negative, rod-shaped, non-spore forming, hyperthermophilic microorganisms, given their name by the presence of a sheathlike envelope called “toga”. Species belonging to the genus Thermotoga were found in terrestrial hot springs and marine hydrothermal vents. The species able to reduce sulfur do not show an alteration of growth yield and stoichiometry of organic products, and no ATP production occurs. Furthermore, toleration to  increases during sulfur reduction, thus they produce  to overcome growth inhibition. The genome of Thermotoga spp. is widely used as a model for studying adaptation to high temperatures, microbial evolution and biotechnological opportunities, such as biohydrogen production and biocatalysis.
 Thermotoga maritima is the type species for the genus Thermotoga, growth is observed between 55 °C and 90 °C, the optimum is at 80 °C. Each cell presents a unique sheath- like structure and monotrichous flagellum. It was firstly isolated from a geothermally heated, shallow marine sediment at Vulcano, in Italy.
Thermotoga neapolitana is the second species isolated belonging to the genus Thermotoga. It was firstly found in a submarine thermal vent at Lucrino, near Naples, Italy, and has its optimum growth at 77 °C

Ecology 
Sulfur-reducing bacteria are mostly mesophilic and thermophilic. Growth has been observed between a temperature range 37-95 °C, however the optimum is different depending on the species (i.e. Thermotoga neapolitana optimum 77 °C, Nautilia lithotrophica optimum 53 °C). They have been reported in many different environments, such as anoxic marine sediments, brackish and freshwater sediments, anoxic muds, bovine rumen, hot waters from solfataras and volcanic areas. Many of these bacteria are used to be found in hot vents, where elemental sulfur is an abundant sulfur species. This happens due to volcanic activities, in which hot vapours and elemental sulfur are released together through the fractures of Earth's crust. The ability of using zero valence sulfur as both an electron donor or acceptor, allows Sulfurimonas spp. to spread widely among different habitats, from highly reducing to more oxidizing deep-sea environments. In some communities found in hydrothermal vents, their proliferation is enhanced thanks to the reactions carried out by thermophilic photo- or chemoautotrophs, in which there is simultaneously production of elemental sulfur and organic matter, respectively electron acceptor and energy source for sulfur-reducing bacteria. Sulfur reducers of hydrothermal vents can be free-living organisms, or endosymbionts of animals such as shrimps and tube worms.

Symbiosis 
Thiodendron latens is a symbiotic association of aerotolerant spirochaetes and anaerobic sulfidogenes. The spirochaete species are the main structural and functional component of these mats and they may accumulate elemental sulfur in the intracellular space. This association of micro-organisms inhabits sulfide-rich habitats, where the chemical oxidation of sulfide by oxygen, manganese or ferric iron or by the activity of sulfide-oxidizing bacteria results in the formation of thiosulfate or elemental sulfur. The partly oxidized sulfur compounds can be either completely oxidized to sulfate by sulfur-oxidizing bacteria, if enough oxygen is present, or reduced to sulfide by sulfidogenic bacteria. In such places oxygen limitation is frequent, as indicated by micro-profile measurements from such habitats. This relationship may represent an effective shortcut in the sulfur cycle.

Synthophy 
Desulfuromonas acetooxidans is able to grow in cocultures with green sulfur bacteria such as Chlorobium (vibrioforme and phaeovibroides). The electron donor for the sulfur-reducing bacterium is acetate, coupled with elemental sulfur reduction to sulfide. The green sulfur bacterium produces  re-oxidizing the  previously produced, in presence of light. During these cocultures experiments no elemental sulfur appears in the medium because it is immediately reduced.

Sulfur cycle 

The sulfur cycle is one of the major biogeochemical processes. The majority of sulfur on Earth is present in sediments and rocks, but its quantity in the oceans represents the primary reservoir of sulfate of the entire biosphere. Human activities such as burning fossil fuels, also contribute to the cycle by entering a significant amount of sulfur dioxide in the atmosphere. The earliest life forms on Earth were sustained by sulfur metabolism, and the enormous diversity of present microorganisms is still supported by the sulfur cycle. It also interacts with numerous biogeochemical cycles of other elements such as carbon, oxygen, nitrogen and iron. Sulfur has diverse oxidation states ranging from +6 to −2, which permit to sulfur compounds to be used as electron donors and electron acceptors in numerous microbial metabolisms, which transform organic and inorganic sulfur compounds, contributing to physical, biological and chemical components of the biosphere.

The sulfur cycle follows several linked pathways.

Sulfate ReductionUnder anaerobic conditions, sulfate is reduced to sulfide by sulfate reducing bacteria, such as Desulfovibrio and Desulfobacter.

 (SO42- + 4H2  H2S + 2H2O +2OH−)

Sulfide Oxidation

Under aerobic conditions, sulfide is oxidized to sulfur and then sulfate by sulfur oxidizing bacteria, such as Thiobacillus, Beggiatoa and many others. Under anaerobic conditions, sulfide can be oxidized to sulfur and then sulfate by Purple and Green sulfur bacteria.

(H2S  S0 SO42-)

Sulfur Oxidation

Sulfur can also be oxidized to sulfuric acid by chemolithotrophic bacteria, such as Thiobacillus and Acidithiobacillus

(S0 + 2O2H2SO4)

Sulfur Reduction

Some bacteria are capable to reduce sulfur to sulfide enacting a sort of anaerobic respiration. This process can be carried out by both sulfate reducing bacteria and sulfur reducing bacteria. Although they thrive in the same habitats, sulfur reducing bacteria are incapable of sulfate reduction. Bacteria like Desulfuromonas acetoxidans are able to reduce sulfur at the cost of acetate. Some iron reducing bacteria reduce sulfur to generate ATP.

(S0 + H2H2S)

These are the main inorganic processes involved in the sulfur cycle but organic compounds can contribute as well to the cycle. The most abundant in nature is dimethyl sulfide (CH3—S—CH3) produced by the degradation of dimethyl sulfoniopropionate. Many other organic S compounds affect the global sulfur cycle, including methanethiol, dimethyl disulfide, and carbon disulfide.

Uses 
Microorganisms that have sulfur-based metabolism represent a great opportunity for industrial processes, in particular the ones that execute sulfidogenesis (production of sulfide). For example, these type of bacteria can be used in to generate hydrogen sulfide in order to obtain the selective precipitation and recovery of heavy metals in metallurgical and mining industries.

Flue gases treatment 
The electron donors would be organics from wastewater, such as acetate and glucose. The SCDD process revisited in this way would take three steps at determinate conditions of pH, temperature and reagents concentration. Furthermore, the 88% of the sulfur input would be recovered as octasulfur and then reutilized, representing both a chemical-saving and a profitable solution.

Treatment of arsenic-contaminated waters 
Sulfur reducing bacteria are used to remove Arsenite from the arsenic-contaminated waters, like acid mine drainage (AMD), metallurgy industry effluents, soils, surface and ground waters. The sulfidogenic process driven by sulfur reducing bacteria (Desulfurella) take place under acid condition and produce sulfide with which arsenite precipitates. Microbial sulfur reduction also produces protons that lower the pH in arsenic-contaminated water and prevent the formation of thioarsenite by-production with sulfide.

Treatment of mercury-contaminated waters 
Wastewater deriving from industries that work on chloralkali and battery production, contains high levels of mercury ions, threatening aquatic ecosystems. Recent studies demonstrate that sulfidogenic process by sulfur reducing bacteria can be a good technology in the treatment of mercury-contaminate waters.

References 

Phototrophic bacteria
Hydrogen biology